This is a list of the 13 members of the European Parliament for Finland in the 2009 to 2014 session.

List

Party representation

Notes

External links
Finnish Ministry of Justice election results, accessed 21 June 2009
Confirmed result. True Finns and Greens successful in the European Parliament elections 2009

Finland
List
2009